Michael Pas (born 21 September 1966) is a Belgian actor. He played detective Bob De Groof in the Belgian crime series Code 37.

Selected filmography
 Eline Vere (1991)
 Toutes peines confondues (1992)
 Daens (1993)
 Anchoress (1993)
 Brylcream Boulevard (1995)
 Kulderzipken( 1995)
 Het 14e kippetje (1998)
 The Wall (1998)
 Speer und Er (2005)
 Code 37 (2009)
 Nymphomaniac (2013)

References

External links

1966 births
Living people
Belgian male film actors
Belgian male television actors
Place of birth missing (living people)